Portland Public Schools or Portland School District may refer to:

Portland Public Schools (Maine), in Portland, Maine, U.S.
Portland Public Schools (Oregon), in Portland, Oregon, U.S.
Portland Public Schools (Connecticut), in Portland, Connecticut, U.S.
Portland Public School District (Michigan), in Portland, Michigan, U.S.
Portland School District (Arkansas), a former school district in Arkansas, U.S.
Gregory-Portland Independent School District